Enolmis arabica is a moth of the family Scythrididae. It was described by Passerin d'Entrèves in 1986. It is found in Saudi Arabia and Yemen.

References

Scythrididae
Moths described in 1986